Blue Notes is an album by American jazz saxophonist Johnny Hodges and orchestra featuring performances recorded in 1966 and released on the Verve label.

Reception 

AllMusic awarded the album 3 stars with its review by Ken Dryden stating, "the veteran alto saxophonist is backed by an all-star group with arrangements by conductor Jimmy Jones. Hodges' gorgeous tone and effortless ability to swing are the cornerstones of the album, especially in a stunning, very slow performance of "I Can't Believe That You're in Love With Me" and the jaunty original by the leader, "L.B. Blues"".

Track listing 
All compositions by Johnny Hodges except where noted.
 "Blue Notes" – 2:50
 "I Can't Believe That You're in Love with Me" (Jimmy McHugh, Clarence Gaskill) – 3:20
 "Rent City" (V. Speddy) – 3:45
 "Sometimes I'm Happy" (Vincent Youmans, Irving Caesar) – 2:40
 "Broad Walk" – 3:30
 "L. B. Blues" – 4:00
 "The Midnight Sun Will Never Set" (Quincy Jones) – 3:30
 "Say It Again" – 3:27
 "Sneakin' Up on You" (Ted Daryll, Carl Taylor) – 5:30

Personnel 
Johnny Hodges – alto saxophone
Ernie Royal, Snooky Young – trumpet
Tony Studd – bass trombone
Jimmy Hamilton – clarinet, tenor saxophone
Frank Wess – alto saxophone, flute
Jerome Richardson – alto saxophone, flute, piccolo
Don Ashworth (tracks 1, 2, 5, 6 & 8), Danny Bank (tracks 3, 4, 7 & 9) – baritone saxophone, bass clarinet
Hank Jones – piano
Kenny Burrell (tracks 1 & 8), Eric Gale (tracks 2–7 & 9) – guitar
Bob Cranshaw (tracks 1, 2, 5, 6 & 8), George Duvivier (tracks 3, 4, 7 & 9) – bass
Grady Tate – drums
Joe Venuto – vibraphone, shakers (tracks 2–7 & 9)
Jimmy Jones – arranger, conductor

References 

Johnny Hodges albums
1967 albums
Albums produced by Creed Taylor
Verve Records albums